Abdolkarim Kakahaji (born 27 October 1961 in Dezful) is a retired Greco-Roman wrestler from Iran. He won a silver medal at the 1986 Asian Games in Seoul. He also participated at the 1988 Summer Olympics.

References

External links
 

1961 births
Iranian male sport wrestlers
Wrestlers at the 1988 Summer Olympics
Olympic wrestlers of Iran
Asian Games silver medalists for Iran
Asian Games medalists in wrestling
Wrestlers at the 1986 Asian Games
Wrestlers at the 1994 Asian Games
Medalists at the 1986 Asian Games
Living people
People from Dezful
Sportspeople from Khuzestan province
20th-century Iranian people
21st-century Iranian people